The 2014 New Zealand Warriors season was the 20th in the club's history. Coached by Matthew Elliott until he was replaced by Andrew McFadden in Round 6, and captained by Simon Mannering, the Warriors competed in the National Rugby League's 2014 Telstra Premiership. They finished the regular season 9th out of 16 teams, failing to make the finals for the third consecutive year. In the pre-season the Warriors also had competed in the inaugural NRL Auckland Nines tournament.

Milestones
9 March - Round 1: Four players made their club debuts for the Warriors; Sam Tomkins, Chad Townsend, Jayson Bukuya and John Palavi.
15 March - Round 2: David Fusitua made his NRL debut.
7 April: Head coach Matthew Elliott resigned as head coach. Andrew McFadden was made acting coach.
13 April - Round 6: Siliva Havili made his NRL debut.
2 May: Shaun Johnson, Ben Henry, Simon Mannering and Siliva Havili played for New Zealand in the 2014 ANZAC Test.
3 May: Suaia Matagi, Michael Sio, Dominique Peyroux and Carlos Tuimavave represented Samoa in the Pacific International.
13 May: Andrew McFadden was appointed head coach until the end of the 2017 season.
1 June - Round 12: Simon Mannering played in his 200th match for the club, and his 100th as club captain. Nathan Friend also played in his 50th game for the club.
19 July - Round 19: Agnatius Paasi made his NRL debut.
27 July - Round 20: Tuimoala Lolohea made his NRL debut.
24 August - Round 24: Ben Matulino played in his 150th match for the club. He is the first NYC graduate from any club to reach the milestone.
18 October: Sam Lisone and Adam Tuimavave-Gerard played for the Junior Kiwis.
Sam Tomkins represented England, Simon Mannering, Manu Vatuvei, Shaun Johnson, Suaia Matagi, Siliva Havili and Thomas Leuluai represented New Zealand and Dominique Peyroux and Michael Sio represented Samoa in the end of year Four Nations tournament.

Jersey and sponsors

Fixtures

Pre-season training
Pre-season training began on 28 October 2013.

Pre-season matches
The Warriors played the Gold Coast Titans at North Harbour Stadium on 9 February and the Brisbane Broncos at Forsyth Barr Stadium on 23 February. The Warriors also played the Wigan Warriors on Wednesday 12 February, in a warm up game before Wigan competes in the 2014 World Club Challenge.

Auckland Nines

The Warriors were coached by Ricky Henry. The squad consisted of Jayson Bukuya, Raymond Faitala-Mariner, Glen Fisiiahi, David Fusitua, Charlie Gubb, Konrad Hurrell, Sebastine Ikahihifo, Shaun Johnson, Solomone Kata, Ngani Laumape, Tuimoala Lolohea, Sione Lousi, Suaia Matagi, Dominique Peyroux, Sam Tomkins, Carlos Tuimavave. At the conclusion of the weekend Shaun Johnson was named the tournament's MVP and Suaia Matagi was named in the team of the tournament.

Regular season 
The Warriors played eight home matches at Mount Smart Stadium, three at Eden Park and another at Westpac Stadium in Wellington. Their loss to the Panthers in the final round saw the Warriors finish the season in 9th place, only just missing out on the finals. This was an improvement on their 11th-placed finish in 2013 and their 14th-placed finish in 2012.

Ladder

Squad

Staff
Chief Executive Officer: Wayne Scurrah
General Manager: Don Mann Jr
General Manager Football Operations: Dean Bell
Medical Services Manager: John Mayhew
Welfare and Education Manager: Jerry Seuseu
Media and Communications Manager: Richard Becht

Coaching staff
NRL Head Coach: Andrew McFadden
NRL Assistant Coach:  Ricky Henry
NRL Assistant Coach: Adam Mogg
NSW Cup Head Coach: Rohan Smith
NSW Assistant Coach: Willie Swan
NYC Head Coach: Stacey Jones
NYC Assistant Coach: Kelvin Wright
Academy and Pathways Manager: Duane Mann

Strength and Conditioning
Strength and Conditioning Coach: Carl Jennings
Strength and Conditioning Coach: Ruben Wiki
Sports Science Manager: Brad Morris
Rehab and Speed Coach: Dayne Norton
Performance Analyst: Adam Sadler

Transfers

Gains

Losses

Other teams
The Warriors entered a team into the NSW Cup for the first time. The team replaced the Auckland Vulcans, who the club previously helped to fund. The Junior Warriors again competed in the Holden Cup.

NSW Cup squad

The NSW Cup side were coached by Rohan Smith. It was the first time that the team had a full-time coach. In June the team took a match to Gisborne's Rugby Park.

The side finished eighth in regular season and made the finals, defeating the Mount Pritchard Mounties 36-28 in the elimination finals. They were eliminated the next week, losing 12-29 to the Illawarra Cutters.

Raymond Faitala-Mariner was named in the NSW Cup team of the year.

Holden Cup Squad

The Junior Warriors won the Holden Cup by defeating the Brisbane Broncos 34-32 in the grand final. The Junior Warriors had finished eighth in the regular season, just qualifying for the finals series. In the finals they defeated the Sydney Roosters 44-30 in the elimination finals.

The Grand Final team was: Brad Abbey, Ngataua Hukatai, Nathaniel Roache, Solomone Kata, Paul Ulberg, Tuimoala Lolohea, Mason Lino (c), Sam Lisone (c), Kurt Robinson, Kouma Samson, Michael Ki, Adam Tuimavave-Gerrard, Jazz Tevaga. Interchange: James Bell, Toafofoa Sipley, Ken Maumalo, Iulio Afoa. Coach: Stacey Jones.

Sam Lisone was named at prop in the Holden Cup team of the year. Solomone Kata won the Jack Gibson Medal as the grand final player of the match.

Awards
Simon Mannering was named the NRL Player of the Year and also received a Legacy award. Konrad Hurrell won the People's Choice Award while Manu Vatuvei was the Club Person of the Year and the Players' Player of the Year. David Fusitu’a was the NRL Rookie of the Year.

The NSW Cup Player of the Year was Agnatius Paasi, who also won the NSW Cup Players' Player of the Year award. Tuimoala Lolohea was the NSW Cup Rookie of the Year.

Sam Lisone won the NYC Player of the Year and NYC Players' Player of the Year awards while Brad Abbey was the NYC Rookie of the Year.

References

External links
Warriors 2014 season rugby league project

New Zealand Warriors seasons
New Zealand Warriors season
Warriors season